The Leader of the Opposition (officially the Leader of His Majesty's Most Loyal Opposition of Belize) is an elected official who, according to the Constitution, "commands the support of those elected officials that do not support the Government." The Leader of the Opposition is the leader of the largest political party in the House of Representatives that is not in government.

The leader of the opposition speaks on behalf of the Opposition Members of House of Representatives and also lead the Shadow Cabinet of Belize.

Leaders of the Opposition of Belize since Independence (1981–present)

Notes 
 Theodore Aranda was removed as UDP leader in Dangriga Town on 21 November 1982 while still holding the office of Leader of the Opposition, which he had held since the UDP lost general elections exactly three years earlier on 21 November 1979. Aranda resigned from the UDP shortly thereafter. Curl Thompson was subsequently elevated to deputy party leader and Leader of the Opposition. Meanwhile, Manuel Esquivel defeated Phillip Goldson in elections for party leader in January 1983. Since Esquivel was a member of the Belize Senate at the time, Thompson remained as Leader of the Opposition in the House until the December 1984 election.
 Florencio Marin became Leader of the Opposition after PUP leader George Cadle Price lost his seat in the 1984 election, which the PUP lost by 21 seats to seven. Price retained his position as PUP leader.
 Price resigned as leader of the PUP on 17 August 1996, during his only term as Leader of the Opposition. He was succeeded as party leader and Leader of the Opposition by Said Musa on 10 November 1996.
 Dean Barrow was named Leader of the Opposition after Esquivel lost his seat in the 27 August 1998 election, in which the UDP retained just three seats, of which Barrow's was one. On 30 August, Esquivel retired to make way for Barrow as the new party leader. Barrow retained the office after the UDP lost elections again on 5 March 2003.
 Musa was appointed Leader of the Opposition on 11 February 2008. However effective 30 March 2008, he stepped down as PUP leader and Leader of the Opposition. He was succeeded by Johnny Briceño of Orange Walk.
 Briceño resigned as PUP leader on 7 October 2011 and as Leader of the Opposition on 18 October 2011, citing health issues. The PUP elected Francis Fonseca as his successor on 3 November 2011.
 Barrow ousted Faber as leader in Parliament after obtaining support from the majority of his colleagues. Faber remains leader of the UDP.

See also
Politics of Belize
Governor-General of Belize
List of prime ministers of Belize

Opposition
Belize